The Splitters is a Croatian rock band composed of four members: Josip Senta, Marko Komić, Petar Senta and Antonio Komić.

History
The Splitters were formed in 2017 in Split, Croatia. They started performing their original songs at various festivals such as the ST@rt festival in Split and the West Herzegowina Festival in Široki Brijeg. The band's debut album Love Sucks was released on 7 April 2018. It was only available via SoundCloud and contained English language songs.

In early 2019 the band signed a record deal with Croatia Records and since then they have been writing Croatian language songs. Their second studio album and first to be recorded in Croatian, Izvedi me van, was released on 2 July 2020.

At the 69th edition of the Zagreb Festival in 2022 they performed the song "Izgubljeni grad". On 9 December 2022, The Splitters were announced as one of the 18 participants in Dora 2023, the national contest in Croatia to select the country's Eurovision Song Contest 2023 entry, with the song "Lost and Found".

Band members
All members have been the same since the band formed in 2017.

Josip Senta – vocals, bass guitar  
Marko Komić – guitar 
Petar Senta – rhythm guitar, vocals 
Antonio Komić – drums

Discography

Studio albums

Singles

References

External links

Croatian rock music groups
Croatian pop music groups
Musical groups established in 2019
2019 establishments in Croatia